Club 22 de Septiembre is a Paraguayan football club in the city of Encarnación. The club currently plays in the Primera B Nacional.

History
In the 2015 Primera División B Nacional season, the club played a promotion play-off against Liga Ovetense to ascend into the División Intermedia for 2016. 22 de Septiembre lost the fixtures on aggregate and would then play the runner-up of the Primera B Metropolitana in order to ascend into the División Intermedia.

Notable players
To appear in this section a player must have either:
 Played at least 125 games for the club.
 Set a club record or won an individual award while at the club.
 Been part of a national team at any time.
 Played in the first division of any other football association (outside of Paraguay).
 Played in a continental and/or intercontinental competition.

Paraguayan players
  Javier Acuña (2001–2002: Youth Academy)
   Juan Marcelo Casas Chamorro (2015)
Non-CONMEBOL players
Ninguno

References

External links

Football clubs in Paraguay